Abshar Dogholu or Dogholu Waterfalls (lit. Twin Falls), is the waterfall in the northern part of Tehran, Iran, and is located near Shirpala shelter positioned in the south face of mount Tochal in the Alborz mountains.

Abshar Dogholu is situated at the elevation of nearly 2750 meters above sea level and is accessible via a route passing through Sarband, Pas-Ghaleh to Shirpala shelter. It literally means Twin Falls and that is because of its natural shape of flowing over the cliff which divides to two separate branches where falling down. The headwaters of the stream is the melting ice and snow on mount Tochal This waterfall is known as one of the most attractive and exciting waterfalls in Tehran.

Kamal-ol-molk painting of the falls
The Iranian prominent painter, Kamal-ol-molk, drew the Abshar Dogholu in the 19th century.

See also 
 Shirpala shelter
 Sangan Waterfall
 Yakhi Waterfall

References 

Waterfalls of Iran